Brad Lewis Kavanagh (born 21 August 1992) is an English actor and musician from Whitehaven, Cumbria. He is a guitarist, songwriter, and singer for the English band FLYNT. 

Kavanagh was part of the original cast of Billy Elliott: The Musical in the role of Michael. He has also appeared on the Disney Channel and in the Nickelodeon production House of Anubis.

Stage acting career
Brad Kavanagh started acting as a child in a local acting group in Cumbria named Whitehaven Theatre Of Youth. He featured heavily in local amateur productions until his professional stage debut in the West End in Billy Elliot the Musical as Billy's best friend, Michael, at the age of 11. He was a student at St Benedict's Catholic High School in Whitehaven, where he completed his GCSEs and attended 6th Form to complete his A-levels in Product Design, Electronics and I.T.

Television career
In 2008, Brad Kavanagh presented the talent competition, My School Musical, on Disney Channel UK.

In 2009, Kavanagh was on the Disney Channel UK presenting Undercover Coach, and featuring in My Camp Rock. He presented the Jonas Brothers 3D Movie Premiere in the UK, which covered the UK premiere of the Jonas Brothers 3D Concert Experience on the morning of the release of the film. He was a judge on Hannah-Oke, an X Factor type game show where contestants and their families sing Hannah Montana songs. He also appeared on American Disney Channel's Pass The Plate.

In mid 2010, Kavanagh was cast as the lead male character, Fabian Rutter on the new Nickelodeon TV show House of Anubis. The series premiered on 1 January 2011, and following the success of the first season, a second season was ordered, where Kavanagh reprised his role as Fabian Rutter.

Kavanagh continued his work on the show once it was renewed for a third season, which began production in mid-2012 and premiered in January in the US.

On 21 May 2013, Nickelodeon announced a 90-minute special of House of Anubis titled Touchstone of Ra which Kavanagh again reprised his role in.

As of 2020, he is currently inactive in the field of acting.

Filmography

Music
Brad Kavanagh has recorded many songs, some of which can be found on his YouTube channel where he posts covers and original songs. Some songs can be purchased on iTunes, while others can be found on YouTube. The earliest of his songs are: "As the Bell Rings" and "Right Time." Both were shown on a Disney channel at regular intervals throughout the day.

In April 2014, Kavanagh performed in Showcase Live alongside Hollywood Ending. In October 2014, he opened for the band on their UK headliner tour, Punk A$$ Kids tour.

Discography

Awards and nominations

References

External links

Brad Kavanagh – the British Zac Efron? Digital Spy, 7 March 2008
Exclusive Brad Kavanagh Interview Female First, 21 February 2008
Brad Kavanagh from As the Bell Rings chats to I Like Music Ilikemusic.com
Disney Channel UK star Brad Kavanagh talks about Camp Rock Sunday Mercury, 24 August 2008

1992 births
Living people
English male musical theatre actors
English male singers
English male television actors
English people of Irish descent
English pop singers
People from Whitehaven